OQYANA is a real estate company that is developing the OQYANA World First archipelago of artificial islands which form the Australasian region of The World development off the coast of Dubai.

OQYANA World First
There will be  of inter-linked walkways,  of shore front and a marina with over 1,500 private yacht berths.

The islands are owned by OQYANA Real Estate Company (K.S.C.C.). The islands were purchased in 2005, and were to be developed as a "lifestyle destination" and community with approximately 2,000 apartments, 200 villas and luxury hotels. Features of the development include a cultural centre for performing arts, a conference centre, leisure facilities, restaurants, cafes and island lifestyle specific retail.

The islands have been terraformed by the developers to the investors' specification. The land was planned to be handed over in the third quarter of 2008 by the developer, Nakheel, with construction starting in late 2008 or early 2009.

Plans for the islands include luxury apartments, harbor vistas, secluded homes, and a number of mansions. Also, included in the development of OQYANA are a retail hub, a luxury hotel, a spa resort, restaurants and cafes. Each island is connected by private corridors (no public access) with water bridges between islands.

The progress of reclamation for the OQYANA islands is complete. The completed land reclamation consists of 20 islands which are embedded into four separate land masses that will serve as construction platforms. Once building is complete these sand platforms will be dredged out and used to enhance the beaches. This land formation plan was created by OQYANA to speed up development during the construction phase. OQYANA planned to begin infrastructure works from the second quarter of 2008.
As of 2010, it is not believed that any further work has progressed and doubts remain about the future of the development.

See also
 The World Islands
 List of Developments on The World Islands

References

External links
 OQYANA Homepage—Official website.

Companies based in Dubai